Caroline Casey may refer to:

 Caroline Casey (activist), Irish activist and social entrepreneur
 Caroline Casey (soccer) (born 1994), American goalkeeper

See also
The Caroline Case